John Blair ( - 13 October 1934) was a Scottish painter, predominantly of watercolour landscapes. Of humble beginnings in Berwickshire, he moved to Edinburgh to study and spent the rest of his life there. His paintings mainly reflect the landscapes around him, both of urban settings and also of the castles, sea and lochs of the Borders, although he also painted figures and still lifes. As well as his original work, his paintings were viewed by a wide audience in the form of picture postcards, book endpapers and illustrations.

Life and career 
Blair was born in the Berwickshire village of Hutton, in about 1849. His family background would not seem to have favoured his choice of career, which suggests a certain degree of ability in order to make it succeed, nor perhaps predicted him leaving an estate of £3418 4s 6d on his death in 1934. His father's occupation is listed on various census records/official documents as "agricultural labourer", "salmon fisher" and "gardener". His parents Alexander and Elisabeth Blair (née Allan), together with their family of 5 children, moved around the area; the census recorded them in Hutton in 1851 and in Coldstream in 1861.

Somewhere in this period, Blair attended the nearby Sunnyside school at Milne Graden, and it is there that local landowner David Milne-Home befriended him. This resulted in Milne-Home arranging for Blair to train at the Trustees Academy School of Art (a forerunner of Edinburgh College of Art), where Blair studied under Charles Hodder.

By 1871 Blair had left home for South Leith, where he lodged with Francis and Clementina Brown at 8 Primrose Street, giving his occupation as "art student".

He first exhibited in the Annual Exhibition of the Royal Scottish Academy in 1870, with paintings entitled "Newhaven", "Fawside Castle, Edinburgh" and "Bait gatherers". He went on to exhibit some 83 paintings in the RSA Annual Exhibitions until 1920.

He is also said to have exhibited at the Dudley Gallery (London), Glasgow Institute of Fine Art, Walker Art Gallery, Manchester City Art Gallery, Royal Hiberian Academy, The Royal Institute of Painters in Water Colours and the Berwick Arts Club, and was a member of the Society of Scottish Artists.

Whilst a student, Blair was awarded several medals of national standing – in 1870 The Scotsman referred to “the silver medal, gained by Mr John Blair in the male school” as one of the 20 silver medals awarded that year across the 103 Government schools.  Then in 1872 the Berwickshire News reported that Blair had been awarded both a gold and a silver medal:  "We understand that the Edinburgh Schools of Arts for young men has this year been successful….. in the national competition of students recently held at London.  The gold medal was awarded to John Blair, a native of Paxton, for the best shaded study of an antique figure, also a silver medal for a study in water colour.  This is the third silver medal taken by him, and the only instance in the Edinburgh School in which a student has carried off a gold and silver medal in the same year."

By the 1881 census he titled himself "artist landscape" and was living in Leith.

Blair married his wife Margaret Hume in 1899, with their respective ages 48 and 39. They lived for some time at 37 Argyle Place, Morningside where Blair stated his profession as "landscape artist" and "Painter (artist)". His obituary in the Berwickshire News stated that his "failing health in late years prevented him using the brush" and this may well explain why he no longer has any paintings exhibited at the Royal Scottish Academy after 1920.

He died on 13 October 1934 at his home, 121 Dalkeith Road, Edinburgh, of "Cerebral haemorrhage 2 days" and "Senility", at the age of 84 years. His funeral, according to The Berwickshire News, was conducted by the Rev. W. Roy Sanderson, St Giles Cathedral, and he was buried in Liberton Cemetery, Edinburgh. In addition to family members, one of his pall-bearers was the artist Hector Chalmers RSA.

Works

Illustrations and picture postcards 

There are numerous works by Blair which continue to come up in auction sales. In addition, his works were used to illustrate a number of publications, and over 80 of them appear as Tuck's Post Cards (Raphael Tuck & Sons). Known publications in which Blair's illustrations were used:

 The Birds of Berwickshire Volume 1 by George Muirhead.
 The Birds of Berwickshire Volume 2 by George Muirhead.
 A Summer in Skye by Alexander Smith.
 Poems of Wordsworth, Nimmo's Clyde Classics series.
 Coloured endpapers for:
 Favourite essays of Emerson
Poems of love by Ella Wheeler Wilcox.
 Poems of Matthew Arnold
 Selected poems and songs of Burns
 Songs and ballads of Scott 1911

Museum collections 
A few of his works are to be found in museum collections, as follows:
 Minneapolis Institute of Art – Ben Venue and the Trossachs.
 Trinity House, Leith – Portrait in oil of Edward Brown (d. 1801) copied from a watercolour by Daniel Orme.
 Museum of New Zealand – Edinburgh from Samson's Ribbs.
 Stirling Smith Art Gallery and Museum – Stirling Castle from Bannockburn.
 Sunderland Museum and Winter Gardens – The Tweed above Norham Castle, Northumberland.
Edinburgh Librairies and Museums and Galleries - Advocate's Close.
In addition, Edinburgh Libraries mounted an exhibition in February 2020 of 13 lithographs of Edinburgh and Midlothian taken from watercolours of John Blair.  The original exhibition of watercolours was held in 1892 at the gallery of Aitken, Dott and Sons in Castle Street, Edinburgh.  The Berwickshire News carried a review which noted that "Mr Blair’s work is really most successful; a labour of love, its results are as valuable from the purely artistic as from the historical point of view; and the care which he has taken to select typical and striking points of view renders the value of the collection to the future historian of Edinburgh very great".

Royal Scottish Academy Annual Exhibitions 
The following works by Blair were exhibited at Annual Exhibitions of the Royal Scottish Academy between 1870 and 1920.

References

Further reading 
Peter J. M. McEwan, Dictionary of Scottish Art and Architecture, Glengarden Press, Ballater, 2004.

External links 

 Trustees Academy School of Art

Scottish male painters
Alumni of the Edinburgh College of Art
1849 births
1934 deaths